Balistoides is a genus of triggerfishes native to the Indo-Pacific region.

Species
There are currently 2 recognized species in this genus:
 Balistoides conspicillum (Bloch & J. G. Schneider, 1801) (Clown triggerfish)
 Balistoides viridescens (Bloch & J. G. Schneider, 1801) (Titan triggerfish)

References

Balistidae
Marine fish genera
Taxa named by Alec Fraser-Brunner